Sekou Andrews (born November 13, 1972) also known as Sekou (Tha Misfit), is an American actor, writer, producer, and innovator of "Poetic Voice".

Sekou Andrews has been performing spoken word poetry professionally since 2002. In that time, he has won two National Poetry Slams, two Independent Music Awards, and six CLIO Awards.  In 2019, Sekou became the first spoken word poet in over 12 years to be nominated for the Grammy Award for Best Spoken Word Album. 

Sekou is the innovator of a new category of public speaking called "poetic voice", which blends inspirational speaking with spoken word poetry. Through his work as a top Black public speaker, Sekou has over 2 decades of experience delivering presentations for hundreds of global brands, Fortune 500 corporations, leading associations, and non-profit organizations, including Nike, Google, AT&T, PayPal, LinkedIn, EA Games, Microsoft, Toyota, and Viacom. Sekou's work and impact on the business world has been notable, including a Forbes article calling Sekou "the de fact poet laureate of corporate America."

Career 
Sekou started his career as a school teacher. While teaching, Sekou pursued music, formed his own record label, Blind Faith Records, and released his early hip-hop albums independently. 

Sekou's work has been featured on national media outlets such as ABC World News, CBS, MSNBC, HBO, Good Morning America, Showtime, MTV, and BET. He has given private performances for such prominent individuals as Maya Angelou, Quincy Jones, Larry King, Hillary Clinton, Norman Lear, Sean "Diddy" Combs, and Coretta Scott King. Sekou also performed for Barack Obama in Oprah Winfrey's back yard.

He is also a voiceover artist and actor with several national commercials, films, and critically-acclaimed two-man play. 

In late 2004, following the conclusion of the Declare Yourself tour, Sekou and fellow poet Steve Connell formed a creative partnership to write and perform spoken word together. As a duo, the two poets toured multiple colleges, created, recorded, and filmed poems for various corporate and political organizations., including ACLU, The Gap, Rock the Vote, NCAA, Oceana, the HBO US Comedy Arts Festival, TEDMED, and The Pasadena Pops Orchestra.

Discography

Studio albums
I Love U/For The Rest of my Life – EP (1998)
Seven: A Kwanzaa Soundtrack (1999)
Therapy – EP (2000)
Afrodeezyackz/The Mumblings of a Madman (2002)
Poetic License (2008)
Sekou Andrews & The String Theory (2019)

Other Releases
2004: "Devil’s Advocate" – Underground Rise: Sunrise Sunset
2019: "Vocalise: Poem of No Words” – Denise Young: Soprano
 2006: “Streets of Gold” – Celeste Prince: Untitled
 2006: “That’s How They Getcha” – Celeste Prince: Untitled
 2013: “DPL Anthem” – Shihan: Music is the New Cotton
 2013: “Keep On Rollin’” – Shihan: Music is the New Cotton

Filmography

Films
 Nike Battlegrounds: Ball or Fall (2003) as Poet/Narrator and Writer
Crossover (2004) as Actor and Writer
I'm Through with White Girls (2007) as cousin2
The Sea of Dreams (2011) as Marvin Bell(Actor) and producer
Rice on White (2017) as I.B.M

Documentaries and TV Series
Lyric Cafe (2002–03) (TV Series) as self-poet
Nike Battlegrounds: Ball or Fall (2003) as Self (Poet/Narrator and Writer)
Crossover (2004) as Self (Actor and Writer)[26]
Underground Poets Railroad (2003) (Documentary) as Sekou Tha Misfit
Def Poetry (2002–2005) (TV Series documentary) as Self – Poet
The Underground (2006) (TV Series documentary) Self as Sekou da Misfit
Graffiti Verité 7: Random Urban Static (2008) (Video documentary) Self as Sekou Tha Misfit
Rhymecology: Write Better Rhymes (2021) (Documentary) Self
The Sound of Us (2021) (Documentary) as Self

Awards and recognitions  
Nomination – Grammy Award for Best Spoken Word Album – "Sekou Andrews & The String Theory" (2020)
Clio Awards 2020
American Business Awards "Entrepreneur of the Year" (Stevie Awards) – Gold Level (2019)
Helen Hayes Award 2008
National Poetry Slam championship Winner (2002, 2003)
2020 Independent Music Awards for "Best Spoken Word Song" and "Best Spoken Word Album
Feature Performance – for President Barack and Michelle Obama in Oprah Winfrey’s back yard
Winner – LA Music Awards for "Outstanding Music Video" (1999)
Winner – Images of Voices & Hope "Award of Appreciation" (2011)

References

External links

American spoken word poets
1972 births
Living people
Musicians from Berkeley, California
American male stage actors
American male voice actors